Dimitri Isler (born 14 May 1993) is a Swiss male freestyle skier. He competed at the 2018 Winter Olympics and took part in the men's aerials event finishing on 12th position.

Isler also competed in the Freestyle-Skiing-Weltmeisterschaften 2019 in Deer Valley, USA. Dimitri Isler competed in the final and ranked 11th. At the FIS Freestyle World Championship 2017 Sierra Nevada, Spain and FIS Freestyle World Championship 2015 in Kreischberg, Austria he missed the final by one place and ranked 13th.

Dimitri Isler won the FIS AERIALS European Cup overall in Aerials Skiing back to back in 2012/2013 and 2013/2014. Isler retired in 2019.

References

External links 
 

1993 births
Living people
Swiss male freestyle skiers
Freestyle skiers at the 2018 Winter Olympics
Olympic freestyle skiers of Switzerland
21st-century Swiss people